Alessandro Vaciago (September 11, 1931 – November 17, 1993) was a Professor of Chemical Structure, University of Rome from 1971 to 1993.  He also served as a Cultural Counselor for the Italian Embassy.

The Accademia dei Lincei awards yearly the Vaciago Prize to distinguished researchers in different fields of science.

List of recipients of the Vaciago Prize
 2005: Paolo Mario de Gregorio, Physics.
 2006: Federico Russo, History.
 2007: Giuseppina Terzo, Mathematics.
 2008: Francesco Mercuri, Chemistry.

References

1931 births
1993 deaths
Italian physical chemists